John Davie,  D.D. (13 September 1777, in Debenham – 10 October 1813, in Bungay) was an academic in the late eighteenth and early nineteenth centuries.

Davie was educated at Ipswich School and Sidney Sussex College, Cambridge. He was a Fellow of Sidney Sussex from 1801, the year he was ordained a priest in the Church of England. He was Master of Sidney Sussex from 1811, and Vice-Chancellor of the University of Cambridge from 1812,  holding both positions until his death.

Notes

1777 births
1813 deaths
Masters of Sidney Sussex College, Cambridge
Fellows of Sidney Sussex College, Cambridge
Alumni of Sidney Sussex College, Cambridge
People educated at Ipswich School
Vice-Chancellors of the University of Cambridge